For the 1935 Isle of Man Tourist Trophy, Stanley Woods provided another surprise by moving again, from Husqvarna to Moto Guzzi.

The 1935 Lightweight TT Race was a debut event for the Italian Omobono Tenni. It was team-mate Stanley Woods that led the 1935 Lightweight TT Race from start-to-finish at an average race speed of  followed by Tyrell Smith and Ernie Nott, both riding for Rudge motor-cycles.

The 1935 Senior TT Race was postponed to the next day due to poor weather. Despite the delay, the race produced one of the most dramatic TT races. The race was led away by Jimmie Guthrie at number 1 while Stanley Woods starting at number 30 had a 15 minute wait. By the last lap of the 1935 Senior TT Race, Jimmie Guthrie had built-up a lead of 26 seconds.

As the Moto Guzzi pit-attendants made preparations for Stanley Woods to refuel on the last-lap, the Norton pit-crew signalled to Guthrie to easy the pace on the last lap.

Senior TT (500cc)
Saturday 22 June 1935 – 7 laps (264.11 miles) Mountain Course.

Junior TT (350cc)
Monday 17 June 1935 – 7 laps (264.11 miles) Mountain Course.

Lightweight TT (250cc)
Wednesday 19 June 1935 – 7 laps (264.11 miles) Mountain Course.

Notes
 Stanley Woods returns to racing in the Isle of Man after breaking a scaphoid bone in his wrist after crashing a 500 Husqvarna on lap 1 of the 1934 Dutch TT Race.
 Major alterations to the Snaefell mountain course are carried out for the 1935 TT Races. This includes the removal of the hump-backed bridge at Ballig and the road work is completed for the Manx Grand Prix in September 1935. Road widening occurs on the Mountain Course at the Highlander, Laurel Bank, Glen Helen (between the Old Quarry and Brew's Restaurant) and at Brandywell with the removal of the Beinn-y-Phott sheep-gate.
 A warm-up period is introduced for the first-time before each race.
 Associated Talking Pictures use the 1935 TT Races for the backdrop for the motion picture No Limit starring George Formby who dreams of riding a 'Shuttleworth Snap' motor-cycle in the Isle of Man TT Races. Filming starts on 15 June 1935 with co-star Florence Desmond using Douglas Beach, White City, Douglas Head Road, the Palace Ballrooms and the Douglas Camera Obscura.
 Royal Enfield entered a 500 cc Four valve-Racing model for the Senior TT 1935. This is the last TT Royal Enfield entered.
 During practice N.Cook riding an Excelsior crashes at Keppel Gate and George Rowley riding for AJSi at Signpost Corner. An injury to a thumb caused by replacing a drive-chain at Sulby causes Wal Handley to withdraw from the 1935 TT Races.
 On lap 3 of the 1935 Junior Race, J.A.Macdonald riding a Norton motor-cycle crashes at Union Mills and is killed.
 The 1935 Lightweight Race is held in poor weather conditions and Omobono Tenni crashes in the mist at the 32nd Milestone on the 5th lap. Although, Tenni continues he again crashes at Creg-ny-Baa and collides with a flag-marshal and suffers a fractured vertebra. Also during lap 5 of the 1935 Lightweight Race Doug.J.Pirie crashes at the 33rd Milestone and is killed.
 The 1935 Senior TT Races are postponed from Friday 21 June 1935 to the following day. Interested visitors to the 1935 Senior Race include, Florence Desmond, the Duke of Richmond and Gordon and Baron Von Falkenhayn the General Director of NSU motor-cycles.

Sources

External links
 Detailed race results
 Isle of Man TT winners
 Mountain Course map

Isle of Man TT
1935
Isle